David Rogers (April 19, 1955 – March 8, 2020) was an American racing driver who won the NASCAR Weekly Racing Series national championship in 1994.

Racing career
Rogers won hundreds of short-track races throughout Florida. He was crowned NASCAR’s National Short Track Champion in 1994 after, while driving his own late model, he won all 22 races at Volusia County Speedway in Barberville, Florida, making him the first NASCAR Weekly Series national champion to complete a season undefeated. He had wins in all of New Smyrna Speedway’s biggest races, including the Florida Governor’s Cup, Orange Blossom 100, Red Eye 100, Pete Orr Memorial and World Series of Asphalt Stock Car Racing.

He competed in 5 NASCAR Busch Series events, 3 in 1982, 1 in 1983 and the other in 1992. His best finish was 9th at Charlotte Motor Speedway, he also failed to qualify to one Busch Series event. He ran 2 ARCA Racing Series races, failed to qualify to one and withdrew from other, between 1980 and 1984.

Rogers also ran 3 NASCAR Southeast Series races, between 1991 and 1992, with a best finish of 6th at Volusia County Speedway.

He used to compete annually in the Snowball Derby, his best finish was 6th (twice), in 2008 and 2013. His last race was in the 2019 Snowball Derby.

Motorsports career results

NASCAR
(key) (Bold – Pole position awarded by qualifying time. Italics – Pole position earned by points standings or practice time. * – Most laps led.)

Busch Series

ARCA Permatex SuperCar Series
(key) (Bold – Pole position awarded by qualifying time. Italics – Pole position earned by points standings or practice time. * – Most laps led.)

References

External links
 

NASCAR drivers
ARCA Menards Series drivers
1955 births
2020 deaths
Deaths from lymphoma
Deaths from cancer in Florida